The Europe Zone was one of the three regional zones of the 1962 Davis Cup.

28 teams entered the Europe Zone, with the winner going on to compete in the Inter-Zonal Zone against the winners of the America Zone and Eastern Zone. Sweden defeated Italy in the final and progressed to the Inter-Zonal Zone.

Draw

First round

Netherlands vs. Soviet Union

Hungary vs. Luxembourg

Denmark vs. New Zealand

Norway vs. Poland

Monaco vs. Brazil

Ireland vs. Austria

Switzerland vs. South Africa

Spain vs. West Germany

Romania vs. Israel

Lebanon vs. Finland

Czechoslovakia vs. Egypt

Belgium vs. Chile

Second round

Italy vs. Soviet Union

Hungary vs. Denmark

Poland vs. Brazil

Austria vs. Great Britain

France vs. South Africa

West Germany vs. Romania

Finland vs. Czechoslovakia

Belgium vs. Sweden

Quarterfinals

Italy vs. Hungary

Great Britain vs. Brazil

West Germany vs. South Africa

Sweden vs. Czechoslovakia

Semifinals

Italy vs. Great Britain

Sweden vs. South Africa

Final

Sweden vs. Italy

References

External links
Davis Cup official website

Davis Cup Europe/Africa Zone
Europe Zone
Davis Cup